Nadeane Walker Anderson, known professionally by her maiden name Nadeane Walker, (1921 – January 7, 2013) was an American journalist, foreign correspondent and former fashion editor for the Associated Press.

Early life
Walker was born in 1921 on a family farm in Canton, Texas, the second youngest of nine children of Charles H. Walker and Wincie Sides Walker. She graduated in 1942 from North Texas Teacher's College, which is now the present-day University of North Texas.

Career 
While working for the Fort Worth Star-Telegram as a staff writer following college, her editors sent her to cover a story on the Women's Army Corps (WAC), the women's branch of the United States Army during World War II. The story changed Walker's career, as she enlisted in the Women's Army Corps soon after covering the corps. Through the WAC, Walker was posted to Europe, where she joined the staff of Stars and Stripes newspaper's Paris edition as a reporter in 1945.

She married Godfrey Anderson, a World War II correspondent for the Associated Press (AP), at a ceremony in Frankfurt, Germany, on October 4, 1946. The couple lived in Germany, Belgium and Sweden before moving to Paris, France. She joined the AP as the news service's European fashion editor, based from Paris. She interviewed some of the largest figures in fashion during post-war period, including Christian Dior and Coco Chanel. Designer Yves Lanvin of the fashion house, Lanvin, named one of his dresses for Nadeane Walker. Walker worked as a London correspondent for the International Herald Tribune and a freelance reporter for numerous other newspapers and magazines after leaving the AP.

Walker moved back to her native Texas in 1970 and took a position as a reporter for the Dallas Times Herald. However, the United States Department of Labor launched an investigation into both gender discrimination and age discrimination at the Dallas Times Herald. Walker cooperated with the Department of Labor's probe and was subsequently fired by the newspaper. She joined a lawsuit filed by the Department of Labor in 1981; the suit led to a change of employment procedures at the Dallas Times-Herald. Walker continued to work as a freelance writer for the next two decades.

Later life 
Walker moved to Austin, Texas, with her daughter after the death of her husband in 1999. She died in Austin of natural causes on January 7, 2013, at the age of 91. She was survived by her daughter, Jane Fredrick, and son, David Anderson.

References

1921 births
2013 deaths
Associated Press reporters
American editors
American fashion journalists
American newspaper reporters and correspondents
American women journalists
Writers from Paris
University of North Texas alumni
Women war correspondents
Writers from Austin, Texas
People from Canton, Texas
Journalists from Texas
20th-century American journalists
Women's Army Corps soldiers
American expatriates in France
21st-century American women